Yuh Hwan-kil (September 23, 1962 – April 21, 2009) was a South Korean former professional boxer who has held the inaugural IBF junior-lightweight title between April 1984 to February 1985.

Professional career
On December 6, 1981, he won the vacant OPBF featherweight title and defended it three times.

On April 22, 1984, Yuh won the inaugural IBF junior-lightweight champion with a split decision win over Rod Sequenan. He defended the belt once before losing it to Lester Ellis in 1985.

Death
On April 21, 2009, he died after 3 years of being in a vegetative state. He had been injured in a hit and run accident.

Professional boxing record

External links
 

1962 births
2009 deaths
Super-featherweight boxers
International Boxing Federation champions
South Korean male boxers
People from Namhae County